In 2012, there were 79 hospitals and clinics in Croatia.

All hospitals listed below are operated by the Croatian health ministry. The ministry classifies hospitals into five categories:
Clinical hospital centre (Klinički bolnički centar or KBC) – five major medical centres in the country, two of which are located in the capital city of Zagreb
Clinical hospital (Klinička bolnica or KB) – three large hospitals, all based in Zagreb
Clinic (Klinika) – three large clinics, two of which are located in Zagreb
General hospital (Opća bolnica or OB) – 22 smaller general hospitals, serving individual counties around the country
Specialist hospitals (Specijalne bolnice) – 27 specialised hospitals, including various children's hospitals, rehabilitation hospitals, psychiatric hospitals, and the like, scattered around the country

List of hospitals
Clinical hospital centres

KBC Osijek in Osijek
KBC Rijeka in Rijeka
KBC Sisters of Charity in Zagreb
KBC Split in Split
KBC Zagreb in Zagreb

Clinical hospitals

 KB Merkur in Zagreb - Medical center with 300 beds, Hospital employs some 1200 medical and support staff.
 KB Sveti Duh in Zagreb - Large General Hospital with over 600 beds. Hospital is located in Črnomerec district of Zagreb.
 KB Dubrava in Zagreb

General hospitals

OB Bjelovar in Bjelovar
ŽB Čakovec in Čakovec
OB Dubrovnik in Dubrovnik
OB Gospić in Gospić
OB Karlovac in Karlovac
OB Croatian Pride in Knin
OB Dr. Tomislav Bardek in Koprivnica
OŽB Našice in Našice
OB Nova Gradiška in Nova Gradiška
OB Ogulin in Ogulin
OŽB Pakrac in Pakrac
OŽB Požega in Požega
OB Pula in Pula
OB Dr. Ivo Pedišić in Sisak
OB Dr. Josip Benčević in Slavonski Brod
OB Šibenik-Knin County in Šibenik
OB Varaždin in Varaždin
OB Vinkovci in Vinkovci
OB Virovitica in Virovitica
OB Vukovar in Vukovar
OB Zabok in Zabok
OB Zadar in Zadar

See also
Healthcare in Croatia

References

External links
 List of medical institutions, Ministry of Health (Croatia)

Croatia
Hospitals
 List
Croatia